In the 1985-86 football season, Newcastle United F.C. participated in the Football League First Division. 

After their promotion two years previously, Newcastle aimed to consolidate their position in the top league of English football. Manager Jack Charlton resigned six days before the start of the season, leading to the appointment of Willie McFaul. The club finished 11th and performed disappointingly in the cups, losing out to Brighton and Hove Albion and Oxford United. 

Paul Stephenson made his debut in a 2-1 victory over Southampton in December 1985 and soon became a first team regular. Star centre-half Glenn Roeder would go on to manage the club twenty years later. The season also saw the breakthrough of Paul Gascoigne as a regular in midfield.

Squad

|}

Transfers

In

Out

First Division

FA Cup

League Cup

External links
 11v11 - Newcastle United match record 1986
 West Ham FC - Martin treble in Newcastle rout

Newcastle United F.C. seasons
Newcastle United